Split peas are an agricultural or culinary preparation consisting of the dried, peeled and split seeds of Pisum sativum, the pea.

Harvesting

The peas are spherical when harvested, with an outer skin. The peas are dried and the dull-coloured outer skin of the pea removed, then split in half by hand or by machine at the natural split in the seed's cotyledon.

There are green and yellow varieties of split pea. Gregor Mendel studied the inheritance of seed colour in peas; the green phenotype is recessive to the yellow one.  Traditionally, the genotype of purebred yellow is "YY" and that of green is "yy", and hybrids of the two, "Yy", have a yellow (dominant) phenotype.

Split peas are high in protein and low in fat, with one gram of fat per  serving. Most of the calories come from protein and complex carbohydrates. The split pea is known to be a natural food source that contains some of the highest amounts of dietary fibre, containing 26 grams of fibre per 100 gram portion (104% DV based on a  diet).

In Indian cuisine, arhar/toor dal (split pigeon peas) and chana dal (split yellow gram, desi chickpeas) are commonly also referred to as peas, although from other legume species than Pisum sativum.

Uses

Culinary

Green and yellow split peas are commonly used to make pea soup or "split pea soup", and sometimes pease pudding, which was commonly prepared in medieval Europe.

Yellow split pea is known as lappeh 
in western Asia and particularly in Iran. It is the main ingredient of the Iranian food khoresh gheymeh, which is served on the side of white rice in Iranian cuisine. It is also an important ingredient in Təbriz küftəsi, a kofta speciality from northern Iran.

In north India, they are generally known as matar ki daal, sometimes used as a cheaper variation for  chhole on stalls offering it.

Yellow split peas are most often used to prepare dal in Guyana, Suriname, Mauritius, South Africa, Trinidad and Tobago, Jamaica and Fiji. Referred to as simply dal, it is prepared similarly to dals found in India, but also may be used in other recipes.

Yellow split peas are used to make a sweet snack in Beijing cuisine.  Wandouhuang (豌豆黄) is a sweetened and chilled pease pudding, sometimes flavored with osmanthus blossoms and dates.

In Europe, the Greek "fáva" is a dish made with yellow split peas pureed to create an appetizer or meze, often topped with capers.

In the winter the Dutch serve a dish called erwtensoep which is primarily made from green split peas.

In the Caribbean, split peas are a key ingredient in many Indian dishes.

Moroccan Berber cuisine has “tamaraqt” or yellow split pea soup with olive oil and cumin added. Salt, garlic and onion can be added to taste. It is eaten with bread.

As Plant Milk
Peas have also been used as a common ingredient as part of Plant milk, especially for the high content of protein that pea-based plant milk provides over alternatives such as plant milks made from soy, oats, almonds, or other varieties.

See also
Horsebread
Marrowfat peas
Pea milk

References

Edible legumes
Greek cuisine